Athanasios Kambaflis was a Greek wrestler. He competed in the men's Greco-Roman light heavyweight at the 1948 Summer Olympics.

References

External links
 

Year of birth missing
Possibly living people
Greek male sport wrestlers
Olympic wrestlers of Greece
Wrestlers at the 1948 Summer Olympics
Place of birth missing
Sportspeople from Central Greece
People from Phocis